The 2011 Russian Football Super Cup (Russian: Суперкубок России по футболу) was the 9th Russian Super Cup match, a football match which was contested between the 2010 Russian Premier League champion and 2009–10 Russian Cup champion, Zenit Saint Petersburg, and the runner-up of 2010 Russian Premier League, CSKA Moscow. The match was held on 6 March 2011 at the Kuban Stadium in Krasnodar, Russia of which Zenit St. Petersburg won that match.

Match details

References 

Super Cup
2011
FC Zenit Saint Petersburg matches
PFC CSKA Moscow matches
Sport in Krasnodar